Delta is a situational awareness and battlefield management system developed and used in Ukraine. The system integrates information from a broad network of participants, including troops, civilian officials, and vetted bystanders; and a wide range of streams, including sensors, intelligence sources, surveillance satellites and drones, especially geolocated data, which it maps in real time, along with pictures of enemy assets. 

Delta is used by the Ukrainian military services, as part of the Russo-Ukrainian War, especially after the launch of the 2022 Russian invasion of Ukraine, for a wide range of battlefield management tasks, including the planning of operations and combat missions, coordination between units, and secure exchange of information about the location of enemy forces.

On the backend side, it's a cloud native environment. On the client side, it runs on regular PCs, laptop, tablets or mobile phones. 

Involved in the development and supervision of the system are the Center for Innovation and Development of Defense Technologies of the Ministry of Defense of Ukraine, the NGO Aerorozvidka and Mykhailo Fedorov, Minister of the Ukrainian Ministry of Digital Transformation. 

The system became broadly operational in August 2022. The software was developed in coordination with NATO. The system was first tested in 2017, as part of a NATO initiative "to wean troops off Russian standards of siloing information among ground units instead of sharing it". Ukraine surprised NATO in quickly making this system even more accessible to troops than "more modern militaries". Delta, in its prototype phase, was first "pressed to its limits" during the Ukrainian counteroffensive to the Russian Kyiv convoy. The Ukrainian Defense Ministry credits Delta for helping identify 1500 confirmed, Russian targets daily during this time period. 

In December 2022, Delta was the target of an adversarial phishing endeavor. 

On 4 February 2023, the Ukrainian government gave approval to full deployment of the Delta system to the Armed Forces of Ukraine and permitted hosting of Delta's cloud-components outside of Ukraine to protect it against missile and cyber attacks.

Centrality of drone warfare

Aerorozvidka specializes aerial reconnaissance and drone warfare and their main contribution to Delta likely lies in this sphere. Delta, in this view, serves as a key link between raw reconnaissance (often remote photographic telemetry), identification, prioritization, and attack, facilitating a more rapid response cycle across diverse and dispersed participants and resources, known in military parlance as the kill chain. 

Systems such as Delta are poised to become a key information-management component of the rapid evolution of drone warfare on the modern battlefield. Mykhailo Fedorov, Minister of Digital Transformation, would like to see 10,000 drones operating continuously along the front lines. This vision entails a substantial network of digital coordination.

For reasons of ongoing operations security, the precise nature of the integration between Delta and drone warfare remains undisclosed.

See also

 Command and Control
 Intelligence, surveillance, target acquisition, and reconnaissance
 Drone warfare
 Kill chain
 Defense industry of Ukraine
 GIS Arta

References

Military of Ukraine